Hek or HEK may refer to:

People 
 Alexander Laloo Hek, Indian 21st century politician
 František Vladislav Hek (1769–1847), Czech writer
 Hek Wakefield (1899–1962), American football player
 Hugh Keough (1864–1912), American sports journalist
 van 't Hek, a Dutch surname

Places 
 Hek, West Azerbaijan, Iran, a village
 Hek, Yazd, Iran, a village

Acronym 
 Halo Editing Kit, a software development kit
 HEK cell (human embryonic kidney cell), a cell line used for transfection experiments
 Hunsrück-Eifel culture (German: Hunsrück-Eifel-Kultur), an Iron Age cultural group of what is now western Germany
 Hunt for Exomoons with Kepler, an exoplanet search program

Other uses
  HEK, IATA code for Heihe Aihui Airport, Heilongjiang Province, China
 Hektoen enteric agar, a microbial agent
 Councilor Vay Hek, an officer of the Grineer Empire in the online game Warframe